is a Japanese manga series written and illustrated by Tsukasa Ōshima. It was published in Kodansha's Weekly Shōnen Magazine between 1990 and 2003. The story revolves around a boy named Toshihiko Tanaka, who has just started at Kakegawa High School in order to play association football with his idol, Yoshiharu Kubo. Toshi's friends are not interested in playing football again this year until he convinces them to join the team. Soon, the team will enter the All-Japan High School Championship.

A 58-episode anime television series adaptation titled  was produced by Toei Animation and broadcast between November 7, 1993 and December 25, 1994, on Fuji Television. A brand-new original anime television series by EMT Squared and Magic Bus titled  aired from July 2 to September 24, 2022, on AT-X, Tokyo MX, TV Shizuoka, ytv, BS NTV, and BS Fuji. Noriyuki Nakamura directed the series, with Junichi Kitamura serving as assistant director, Mitsutaka Hirota writing the scripts, and Yukiko Akiyama designing the characters. Crunchyroll has licensed the series.

A side story volume centered around Yoshiharu Kubo was released in 1994.

Shoot! won the 1994 Kodansha Manga Award for the shōnen category.

Story
Toshihiko "Toshi" Tanaka joined the same soccer club that his idol, Yoshiharu Kubo plays for at Kakegawa High School. When Toshi played in junior high with two of his friends Kenji Shiraishi and Kazuhiro Hiramatsu, they were known as the Kakenishi golden trio. Now in high school, his friends do not want or cannot play soccer anymore. Hiramatsu is forced to study by his father so that he would become a respectable adult. However, Hiramatsu loves soccer and wants to play so he confronts his father and says that he wants to play soccer with his friends and that he would never understand his love for soccer. It turns out that his father played soccer during his youth and, remembering how much he loved it, decides to let Hiramatsu play soccer but under the condition that he will keep his grades up as well. Shiraishi on the other hand quit soccer because he lost his temper and got into a fight that ended up disqualifying their team. In the end, he joins the Kakegawa High School soccer club because he loves soccer and playing in the golden trio.

Tragedy struck Kake-High soccer club when they lost their captain and ace striker Yoshiharu Kubo. During the semifinal match against Kakekita, they were down 1–2 with less than ten minutes left. Kubo was on defense helping Kenji defend the goal against Hirose's Knuckle Shoot, when he decided to make an effort to tie the game. Kubo took the ball from his own side of the pitch, passed every Kakekita player, and scored the tying goal. After the goal, Kubo collapsed and died after the game. Toshi scored the last and winning goal for Kake-High with the end result 2–3.

Afterwards, the team can't get over Kubo's death and lose to Fujita East before they get to the Nationals. Soon after, Mahori, a Brazilian-Japanese student appears. He decides to join their team after making a bit of mayhem. The whole team decides to follow Kubo's example and play fun soccer, vowing to get to the Nationals in his name.

Characters

Aoki Densetsu Shoot!

The main character of Aoki Densetsu Shoot!. He is a freshman on the soccer team. When he joined the soccer club of Kakegawa High, he's only assigned to do the laundry by Co-Captain Kamiya. Later on during middle-school, the team recognized his ability and let him join the training.
At first, Toshi was not balanced in stepping. After examining his legs, Yoshiharu Kubo found out that Toshi's true strength lied in his left leg, not his right. This caused Kubo to put him in separated training apart from their teammates. Even though Toshihiko protested about this change, rigorous shooting training with his left leg made him discover that it had immense power, something that he had not felt before with his right. He has a crush on Kazumi, but they always end up arguing, and he can't seem to bring himself to tell her so directly.

One of Toshi's best friends since a young age. He stopped playing soccer to study more because of his father's will. But after a chat with Toshihiro, he gets talked into playing soccer again. Kazuhiro convinces his father, who also played soccer at a young age, to let him play soccer again. He was remarked as the genius player through the anime. He has a signature move: his "Heel Shoot" which causes confusion in his opponents by making it look like the ball disappears. Kazuhiro also has a crush on Kazumi, and is a love-rival of Toshi's.

Kenji had also stopped playing soccer. Before the series, he had gotten his team disqualified from a tournament for starting a gang-fight. Much like Kazuhiro, he gets convinced to pick up soccer again and join the school team. His skills as a goalkeeper are praised throughout the series, primarily his great capability of sensing accurately the direction to where the ball is going. He is hot-tempered and picks fights easily. Kenji's signature move is his "Moon Salto Save." He found this move later in the series. With this move he defended the goal from Willy Reinhart's Wolf Shoot, making Kakegawa impenetrable.

The Manager of the soccer club. She's always there to cheer them up and stop the fan girls getting near 'her' team. She has always liked Toshi more than just as a childhood friend, but he "appears" to have no interest in her. Later on, she quits being soccer manager to start a career in the idol show business because she wants "to shine as bright as Toshi does".

The Vice-Captain of the soccer team. He's always a bit rude, but he is still a kind-hearted person. He used to play selfishly back in middle school and his team didn't accept him, but as Kubo joined them, they became a strong formation together. After Kubo died, he became Captain and assigned Toshi the No. 10 uniform. It was also Kubo's will that Toshi succeeded him. Kamiya seems conceited sometimes, but he is nothing like this.
As captain he has the air of a leader. He thinks fast, creating strategies which can help the team and he is the one to motivate and help his teammates. He cares deeply for the team and has a great sense of responsibility. When Mahori appeared, the club separated into two factions: those who agreed with Mahori that the team had to change its style, like Kazuhiro, Nitta and Akahori, and those who insisted on following Kubo's play, like Tanaka, Kenji, Yuutaka and Shigeki (who was the leader of this team).
Kamiya arranged a practice match between the two teams with him as a referee. Through this match the second team found their past motive and way of playing. They tied the match in the last minute making an all-out attack; even Kenji let the post in order to score. After that everyone understood their mistake and decided to fight together till the end. Kamiya himself entered the match, seeing his teammates playing with their old style, unable to resist, taking everyone by surprise. Kamiya proved that he was thinking one step ahead of his teammates, especially after he took the place of the captain.
Kamiya makes an excellent playmaker. With his sharp pass, he can easily confuse the opponent. As his skills were improving, he became one of the best play makers of the nation. Moreover, later his abilities were recognized, and he was considered as good as Kubo, especially in the leading of his team.

Genius Kubo was an extremely skillful and talented soccer player. His opponent saw him as the biggest rival and threat; his teammates followed the light and hope shone from his football. He lived in Germany for years before going back to Japan. Although he was invited by a lot of big football school, he chose to build his own team and went to Kakegawa. Kubo's talent was extraordinary that led the newly formed team to the quarterfinal in the national tournament. Also, Kubo did the coaching job of the team too, he made the tactic and worked on the training of the team. The player had affected many people with his talent. Facing Kakekita in the province semifinal, Kubo wrote a legend by getting through all 11 opponents and put the ball in the net. Yet he used too much energy and died due to leukemia. He died in episode 19. The members of the team carry on his will of "fun-soccer" during the rest of the series. Kubo had superior skills than other players, and he alone can execute one special shoot that later is done by combining Toshi and Kazuhiro together.

Keigo appeared for the first time on episode 21. He lived in Brazil for six years, and he got back to Japan just after Kubo died. Learning his skill from Brazil, the Samba technique excites the audience. He fills in Kubo's spot splendidly using his polished skills. Originally annoyed by his teammates because of his attitudes, it was him who pointed out that Kakegawas had to free themselves from Kubo's shadow.

Sasaki wasn't considered a very good player. Sasaki his self entered the team to be with his best friend Nitta, as he was more into music and indeed a member of a band. However, through the anime Sasaki shows very good skills, he was chosen for the main squad from the beginning while Nitta entered a lot later. But knowing the secret practices Nitta has after school, he is willing to accompany his friends instead of guitar practice. His stamina and Speed, which are fast as Kazuhiro's are remarkable and he seemed to get too close with the team later. When Kubo died in a conversation, he mentioned that Kubo was the one who made him take the decision to enter too.

He's a close friend of Sasaki. His role in story is minor. But surprisingly, he's often the savior in the heat of the game. His ability is creating offside-trap that often helped the team in dire situations when dangerous opponent strikers are attacking. His innocent face combined with great offside timing proves true alongside Kakegawa team. Although he's good at defending, he sometimes made mistakes by soloing the dribble pushing the opponents alone. This causes more advanced opponents to easily retake the ball from him and counterattack Kakegawa.

Otsuka is a big and strong player. His tackle and shooting are all about power. And he plays a very important role to the team. He is a good friend with Akahori and they went to the same junior high. He is a very impetuous and impulsive person. When the team was recruiting, he didn't want to join because he disliked the way Kamiya played. Kamiya then apologized and both Otsuka and Akahori joined the team at the end.

Akahori is very tall, standing 1.92 m. He is very tough in the defensive end. He took over the whole defensive responsibility on his own shoulders before Kenji came over as the goalie. Now, he is still the strongest and smartest defender in the team. Off the field, he is very kind and easy going. He can also play basketball well. In junior high, he used to play goalkeeper.

Shoot! Goal to the Future

Music

Aoki Densetsu Shoot!
Opening theme "Keep Going until Reaching your Dream"～ (Yell ~Anata no Yume ga Kanau Made~)" by WENDY
Ending themes
"Sunao de Itai" by WENDY (1–46, 58)
"Watashi Datte" by Noriko Hidaka (47–57)

Shoot! Goal to the Future
Opening theme "Aoreido" by Airi Miyakawa

Ending theme "Rivals" by All at Once

Video game
Two video games, both titled Aoki Densetsu Shoot!, were made for the Super Famicom and the Game Boy. The Super Famicom game was developed by Affect, published by KSS, and released on December 16, 1994, while the Game Boy game was published by Banpresto and released on April 7, 1995. Both games have exhibition modes, story modes, and a variety of options. Famicom Tsūshin scored the Game Boy game an 18 out of 40.

References

External links
 Aoki Densetsu Shoot! official website 
 Shoot! Goal to the Future official website 
 

1990 manga
1993 anime television series debuts
1994 anime films
2022 anime television series debuts
Anime series based on manga
Association football in anime and manga
Crunchyroll anime
EMT Squared
Fuji TV original programming
Kodansha manga
Magic Bus (studio)
Shōnen manga
Toei Animation films
Toei Animation television